Gayla Trail (born July 31, 1973 in St. Catharines, Ontario) is a Canadian writer, gardener, designer, and photographer. She is the founder of the website You Grow Girl.

Books
You Grow Girl: The Ground Breaking Guide to Gardening (2005) 
Grow Great Grub: Organic Food from Small Spaces (2010) 
Easy Growing  (2012) 
Drinking the Summer Garden (2012)
Grow Curious: Creative Activities to Cultivate Joy, Wonder, and Discovery in Your Garden (2017)

References

External links
 You Grow Girl 

1973 births
Canadian garden writers
Living people
Canadian women photographers